Articles (arranged alphabetically) related to Guinea include:



0-9 
1958 independence

A 
 AfricaPhonebook/Annulaires Afrique
Aluminum
Aluminium in Africa
Aluminium in Guinea
Alcan
 Alcan in Africa
Alcoa
Alumina
Alumina Company of Guinea, operating a mine at Fria
Boké Alumina Corporation,
Centre de Promotion et de Developpement Miniers,
Comalco
Compagnie des Bauxites de Guinee SA,
Euronimba,
Global Alumina
Global Alumina Products Corporation smelter project in Conakry
Guinea Aluminum Products Corporation Ltd,
Halco Mining,
La Societé Aurifère de Guinée,
Ministère des Mines, de la Geology et de l'Environment,
Ministry of Mines and Geology,
Office des Bauxites de Kindia,
Pechiney
Reynolds Metals
Rio Tinto Mining
Rusal - Russian aluminum
Secretariat of State for Mines and Energy (hydrocarbons division),
Societe Ashanti de Guinee,
Société Aurifére de Guinée SA,
Societé des Bauxites de Kindia,
Societé Mifergui-Nimba,
Societe Miniere de Dinguiraye
 Societe Semafo gold

B 
Bauxite

C 
 Sekou Benna Camara
 Chocolate
 Cocoa
Comalco
 Communications in Guinea
Compagnie des Bauxites de Guinee CBG, at Boké; Guinea's largest aluminum company
 Conakry the capital
 Cote d'Ivoire
 Culture of Guinea

D 
 Demographics of Guinea
 Districts of Guinea

E 
 Economy of Guinea
 Education in Guinea

F 
 Foreign relations of Guinea

G 
Geography of Guinea
Guinea
Guinea Alumina Corporation
Guinea-Bissau
Guinea (disambiguation)
Guinean Entertainment Agency
Guinee Equatoriale/Equatorial Guinea

H 
Halco Mining - aluminium

I 
IRIN - UN news agency
 Islam in Guinea
 Ivory
 Ivory Coast
 Iron ore
 Societé Mifergui-Nimba

J

K

L 
 Lansana Conté  president
 LGBT rights in Guinea (Gay rights)
 List of cities in Guinea
 List of Guineans
 List of Guinean companies
 List of mammals of Guinea
 List of birds of Guinea
 List of national parks of Guinea

M 
Microfinance
Microfinance Gateway - microfinance online
Microfinance in Guinea
 Military of Guinea
Mining
 Music of Guinea

N 
N'Zoo

O 
Ordre des Avocats de Guinée

P 
 Palm oil
Palm kernel oil
Palmitic acid
Pechiney
 Politics of Guinea
Pride Finance - microfinance company

Q

R 
Radio France Internationale (RFI)
Radio Liberty FM
Radio Soleil
Radio Nostalgie
 Regions of Guinea
Reynolds Metals
Rio Tinto Mining
Rural Credit of Guinea/Crédit Rural de Guinée CRG - microfinance
Rusal - Russian aluminum

S 
 Sankiniana
 Sierra Leone
Smelting
Societé des Bauxites de Kindia operated by Rusal
 Societe Semafo

T 
 Tintioule
 Transportation in Guinea

U

V

W 
 West Africa
 Wildlife of Guinea

X

Y 
Yété Mali "help yourself" - microfinance company

Z

See also

Lists of country-related topics - similar lists for other countries

 
Guinea